Wallen or Wallén may refer to:

People with the surname

Wallen
Wallen (singer) (born 1978), French singer
Ashley Wallen, Australian choreographer
Byron Wallen (born 1969), British jazz trumpeter, composer and educator
Dick Wallen (born c. 1936), American football player
Errollyn Wallen (born 1958), Belize-born British composer
Filippa Wallen (born 2000), Swedish footballer
Gary Wallen (born 1955), English cricketer
Harley Wallen, Swedish-American actor, writer and director
John Wallen (1785–1865), British architect and surveyor
Keith Wallen (born 1980), American singer, songwriter
Morgan Wallen (born 1993), American country music singer and songwriter
Norm Wallen (1918–1994), American Major League Baseball player
R. T. Wallen (born 1942), American artist based in the state of Alaska best known for his stone lithographs of Alaskan wildlife and native peoples and for his monumental bronze sculptures
Romel V. Wallen (born 1980), Jamaican footballer 
William Wallen (disambiguation), a number of architects and/or surveyors carrying the name

Wallens
Johan Wallens (born 1992), Colombian footballer
Ronald Wallens (1916–1995), British Royal Air Force officer, who flew during the Battle of Britain and as such is one of "The Few"

Wallén
Angelica Wallén (born 1986), Swedish handball player
Ebbe Wallén (1917–2009), Swedish bobsledder 
Hans Wallén (born 1961), Swedish sailor
Jan Wallén (born 1935), Swedish former sports shooter
Martti Wallén (born 1948), Finnish operatic bass singer
Mona Wallén-Hjerpe sometimes called Sjösalakvinnan (1932-2008), Swedish author and criminal
Peter Wallén (born 1965), Swedish ice hockey player
Sigurd Wallén (1884–1947), Swedish actor, film director, and singer
Ville Wallén (born 1976), Finnish footballer
William Wallén (born 1991), Swedish ice hockey forward

People with the given name
Wallen Mapondera (born 1985), Zimbabwean visual artist

Places
Wallen Slate Formation, a geologic formation in Germany
Wallen Ridge (also called Wallens Ridge), a ridge in the U.S. states of Tennessee and Virginia

See also
De Wallen or De Walletjes, the largest and best known red-light district in Amsterdam, Netherlands